Geoff Ferris (born 2 August 1936) is a British racing car designer who has designed open-wheel racing cars for Penske Racing (Formula One and CART), Lotus (Formula One), Brabham (Formula 2, Formula Atlantic/B, Formula 3, and F5000).

He has twice (1980 and 1982) won the Louis Schwitzer Award for innovation and engineering excellence in the field of racing car design.

References

Living people
English motorsport people
Formula One designers
1936 births